Beddomeia phasianella is a species of very small freshwater snail that has a gill and an operculum, an aquatic operculate gastropod mollusk in the family Hydrobiidae. This species is endemic to Australia.

Characteristics 
The elongate shell of Beddomeia phasianella is comparatively smaller than other species of Beddomeia. It has a length of 1.87-2.25mm and a width of 1.15-1.33mm. The Teleoconch (adult shell) has around 2.6-3.4 convex whorls, the shell is consistently rounded at the edge of the last whorl and has faint growth lines towards the helicocone. The periostracum (the outermost layer) of the shell is yellow in color. On the other hand, the protoconch (larva stage shell) has roughly 1.75 whorls, it is covered with faint spiral and axial wrinkles, and exhibit medial indication of pustules.

Threats 
threat and conservation information.

See also
List of non-marine molluscs of Australia

References

External links

Gastropods of Australia
Hydrobiidae
Beddomeia
Vulnerable fauna of Australia
Endemic fauna of Australia
Gastropods described in 1993
Taxonomy articles created by Polbot